The U-27 class was a class of eight submarines or U-boats built for and operated by the Austro-Hungarian Navy ( or ) during World War I. The class was based upon the German Type UB II design of the German Imperial Navy and was constructed under license in Austria-Hungary.

After the Austro-Hungarian Navy had filled its most urgent needs for submarines after the outbreak of World War I, they selected the German Type UB II design for its next group of submarines in mid 1915. Orders for the first six boats were placed in October 1915 with the Austrian firm of Cantiere Navale Triestino and the Hungarian firm of Ganz Danubius. Two more boats were ordered in 1916, bringing the class total to eight.

For propulsion they were equipped with twin diesel engines for surface running and twin electric motors for subsurface movement. Although the class was based on the German design, the Austro-Hungarian U-boats were heavier and slightly faster underwater, but less heavily armed than their German counterparts

Two boats sank only one ship each, and a third, sank no ships. U-30 was also the only boat of the class to be lost during the war. The remaining seven were ceded to France and Italy as war reparations and six were scrapped by 1920; the seventh sank while being towed to Bizerta for scrapping.

Background 

After these steps alleviated their most urgent needs, the Austro-Hungarian Navy selected the German Type UB II design for its newest submarines in mid 1915. The Germans were reluctant to allocate any of their wartime resources to Austro-Hungarian construction, but were willing to sell plans for up to six of the UB II boats to be constructed under license in Austria-Hungary. The Navy agreed to the proposal and purchased the plans from AG Weser of Bremen.

Design 

The U-27-class boats were coastal submarines that displaced  surfaced and  submerged. The boats were capable of  while surfaced and  while submerged. The U-27 class boats were designed for a crew of 23–24.

The U-27-class boats were armed with two  bow torpedo tubes and carried a complement of four torpedoes. They were also equipped with a 75 mm/26 (3.0 in) deck gun and an  machine gun.

Differences from the Type UB II submarines 
Although the U-27 design was based on the German Type UB II submarine, there were some differences between the two designs. The Austro-Hungarian boats were slightly heavier than their German counterparts, by only  while surfaced, but by  while submerged. Both types of submarines were rated at the same  on the surface, but the Austro-Hungarian boats were reported as over  faster underwater even though the electric motors of the two classes had comparable power output. The German boats were more typically more heavily armed than their Austro-Hungarian cousins, and featured two larger torpedo tubes— vs. —and many sported a larger deck gun— vs. .

== Chased, the Austro-Hungarian Navy began the intricate political negotiations to assign the six boats—to be designated U-27 to U-32—between Austrian and Hungarian firms. Of the initial order of six boats, two were allocated to the Austrian firm of Cantiere Navale Triestino (CNT) operating out of the Pola Navy Yard, and the balance to the Hungarian firm of Ganz Danubius in Fiume. The Navy ordered the first six boats of the class on 12 October 1915.

The first six boats were all laid down between late 1915 and early 1916. The seventh and eighth boats were constructed by CNT at the Pola Navy Yard. Shortages of labor and materials plagued subcontractors and, consequently, the delivery dates for the boats were not met. However, the first six boats had all entered service by the middle of 1917.

The final boat launched was U-41 on 11 November 1917. The U-27 class boats were the last domestically built submarines completed for the Austro-Hungarian Navy.

Service career 
All the boats of the U-27 class, the most numerous of all the Austro-Hungarian submarine classes, saw active service, and all but one boat had wartime successes;  sank no ships during her career, and disappeared after the end of March 1917, the only boat of the class to be lost during the war. U-41 had little success, with sinking a single ship. At the other end of the spectrum, U-27, the lead boat of the class, sank the largest number of ships, 34, and  sank the greatest amount of tonnage, .

All four of these boats were ceded to Italy as war reparations and were scrapped by 1920. U-29, and U-41 were half of the six submarines at Cattaro, and were all awarded to France. The boats were towed from Cattaro to Bizerta, but U-29 foundered en route; U-31, U-41, and the others were scrapped within twelve months of their arrival there.

Class members

SM U-27 

U-27, the lead boat of the class, was built by the Austrian firm of Cantiere Navale Triestino (CNT) at the Pola Navy Yard and launched on 19 October 1916. She was commissioned on 24 February 1917. During the war, she sank the British destroyer , damaged the Japanese destroyer , and sank or captured 34 other ships totaling . U-27 was surrendered at Pola at war's end and handed over to Italy as a war reparation in 1919 and was broken up the following year. Conway's All the World's Fighting Ships 1906–1921 calls U-27 Austria-Hungary's "most successful submarine".

SM U-28 

U-28 was built by CNT at the Pola Navy Yard and launched on 8 January 1917. The boat was commissioned on 26 June 1917. Under the command of Zdenko Hudeček, U-28 sank ten ships totaling  and damaged another . She was surrendered to the Italians at Venice in 1919 and scrapped in 1920.

SM U-29 

U-29 was built by the Hungarian firm of Ganz Danubius at Fiume and launched on 21 October 1916. She was commissioned on 21 January 1917, the first of the class to be commissioned. Under commander Leo Prásil, U-29 sank three British steamers and damaged the British protected cruiser . U-29 was at Cattaro at the end of the war and awarded to France as war reparation in 1920, but foundered while under tow to Bizerta for scrapping.

SM U-30 

U-30 was built by Danubius at Fiume, launched on 27 December 1916, and commissioned on 17 February 1917. The boat, under the command of Linienschiffsleutnant Friedrich Fähndrich, sailed from Cattaro on 31 March 1917 and was never heard from again. U-30 sank no ships during her brief career.

SM U-31 

U-31 was built by Danubius at Fiume and launched on 28 March 1917. She was commissioned on 24 April 1917. In addition to damaging the British light cruiser  in October 1918, during the battle of Durazzo. U-31 sank two Italian vessels totaling . She was scrapped in Bizerta after she was awarded to France in 1920.

SM U-32 

U-32 was built by Danubius at Fiume and launched on 11 May 1917. The boat was commissioned on 29 June 1917. At Pola at war's end, the boat was handed over to Italy and scrapped in 1920.

SM U-40 

U-40 was ordered after the funds to purchase the boat were presented by the Österreichischen Flottenverein as a gift to the Austro-Hungarian Navy. She was built by CNT at the Pola Navy Yard, launched on 21 April 1917. and commissioned on 4 August 1917. During the war, U-40 sank three ships and damaged three others, hitting a total of  Commonwealth shipping. The Italian destroyer Ardea claimed to have sunk U-40 in a depth charge attack on 26 April 1918, but the boat was surrendered to Italy at Venice in 1919 and broken up.

SM U-41 

She was built by CNT at the Pola Navy Yard and launched on 11 November 1917. U-41 was commissioned on 19 February 1918, the last boat of the class, and the last Austro-Hungarian boat completed and commissioned into the Austro-Hungarian Navy. U-41 sank a single French steamer of  during her short wartime career, and was at Cattaro at war's end. She was ceded to France in 1920 and towed to Bizerta, where she was scrapped within the year.

Notes

References

Bibliography 

 
 
 
 
 

Submarine classes